The 1926 Gonzaga Bulldogs football team was an American football team that represented Gonzaga University during the 1926 college football season. In their second year under head coach Maurice J. "Clipper" Smith, the Bulldogs compiled a 5–2–1 record and outscored all opponents by a total of 204 to 36.

The Bulldogs' 1926 roster included halfback Mel Ingram, who later played Major League Baseball.

Schedule

References

Gonzaga
Gonzaga Bulldogs football seasons
Gonzaga Bulldogs football